Cape Fear Academy is a private, coeducational PK3–12 school in Wilmington, North Carolina that was established on September 11, 1967 as a segregation academy. It was named for Cape Fear Military Academy, an independent school for boys in Wilmington that operated from 1868 until 1916. The present school's first class graduated in 1971.

History

The school was founded as a segregation academy in response to the court ordered integration of public schools. In 1967, the civil rights activist Lee Shelton claimed that Ku Klux Klan was raising funds to establish Cape Fear Academy as a private school for white students.

In 2005, the student body voted to change the school's athletics team name from The Rebels to The Hurricanes.

In 2021, Cape Fear Academy was sued by a student who alleged that CFA expelled her after she protested the school's failure to take action after she was sexually assaulted and then harassed by three male students, in violation of Title IX. The school argued that, since it never accepted federal funding, it was not subject to any federal non-discrimination laws. In June 2022, Judge James C. Dever ruled that since CFA had accepted loans under the Paycheck Protection Program, the school was obliged to comply with federal civil rights laws.

The lawsuit led to renewed media attention concerning Cape Fear Academy's history of racial and gender discrimination.

Facilities
There is one Pre-kindergarten class (ages 3.5 to 5), along with Kindergarten through Grade 5, Middle School (grades 6–8) and Upper School classes (grades 9–12).

The school is situated on a  campus. Facilities include two classroom buildings, a gymnasium with six classrooms, the Beane-Wright Student Center, science laboratories, and multiple athletic fields, including a tennis facility.

In 2022, the school purchased an  plot of land originally owned by Trinity United Methodist Church.

Accreditation 
Cape Fear Academy is accredited by the Southern Association of Colleges and Schools and also by the Southern Association of Independent Schools. The school is also an active member of the National Association of Independent Schools, the Southern Association of Independent Schools, the North Carolina Association of Independent Schools, the Educational Records Bureau, the Independent School Management Consortium, and the College Entrance Examination Board. Cape Fear Academy offers affordability plans for tuition; a majority of the awards go to students in the Middle and Upper School.

Student activities
Starting in seventh grade, students can play sports; 80% of students in the Upper School participate in at least one sport. Some notable athletics activities in the school are soccer, volleyball, tennis, basketball, and lacrosse. The school houses many clubs like Beta Club, National History Day, YMCA's Youth and Government, and National Honor Society. The school also has a theater program that produces many different genres of plays from Musicals to Dramas. Along with the stage on the campus, the school is the only school high school allowed to perform at Thalian Hall in Wilmington. The Upper School has a student-government association with a branch called the Honor Council that deals with and makes recommendations for disciplinary infractions.

Notable alumni
Patrick Ballantine North Carolina state senator and gubernatorial candidate
Maddie Hasson actress on ABC Family's Twisted
Reginald Shuford ACLU attorney, first black student to graduate

See also 

 New Hanover High School
 John T. Hoggard High School

References

External links
 Cape Fear Academy Alumni

Schools in Wilmington, North Carolina
Private high schools in North Carolina
Private middle schools in North Carolina
Private elementary schools in North Carolina
Segregation academies in North Carolina
Ku Klux Klan in North Carolina
1968 establishments in North Carolina
Educational institutions established in 1968